The Flying Fox of Snowy Mountain is a Hong Kong television series adapted from Louis Cha's novels Fox Volant of the Snowy Mountain and The Young Flying Fox. It was first broadcast on TVB in 1985.

Cast
 Note: Some of the characters' names are in Cantonese romanisation.

 Ray Lui as Wu Fei / Wu Yat-do
 Angie Chiu as Ma Chun-fa
 Margie Tsang as Miu Yuek-lan
 Rebecca Chan as Nam Lan
 Kenneth Tsang as Tin Kwai-nung
 Patrick Tse as Miu Yan-fung
 Wong Wan-choi as Fuk-hong-on / Chan Ka-lok
 Jaime Chik as Mrs Wu
 Lee Hoi-sang as Tong Pui
 Chow Sau-lan as Yuen Tsi-yee
 King Doi-yam as Ching Ling-so
 Long Tin-sung as Ping Ah-say
 Benz Hui as Yim Kai
 Chu Siu-bo as Tin Ching-man
 Shih Kien as Seung Kim-ming
 Law Lan as Old Mrs Seung
 Eddie Kwan as Seung Bo-tsen
 Yeung Chak-lam as Fung Tin-nam
 Cheung Ying-choi as Monk Mo-sun
 Felix Lok as Shek Meng-Tsen
 Bau Fong as To Hei-meng
 Nam Tin as Ma Heng-hoon
 Lau Kong as Lei Tsi-sing
 Chun Wong as Chiu Bun-shan
 Amy Hu as Lok Bing
 Bonnie Wong

External links

1985 Hong Kong television series debuts
1985 Hong Kong television series endings
TVB dramas
Works based on Flying Fox of Snowy Mountain
Television series set in the Qing dynasty
Hong Kong wuxia television series
1980s Hong Kong television series
Cantonese-language television shows
Television shows based on works by Jin Yong